Thailand competed at the 2014 Summer Youth Olympics, in Nanjing, China from 16 August to 28 August 2014.

Medalists

Athletics

Thailand qualified seven athletes.

Qualification Legend: Q=Final A (medal); qB=Final B (non-medal); qC=Final C (non-medal); qD=Final D (non-medal); qE=Final E (non-medal)

Boys
Track & road events

Field Events

Girls
Field events

Badminton

Thailand qualified two athletes based on the 2 May 2014 BWF Junior World Rankings.

Singles

Doubles

Basketball

Thailand qualified a girls' team based on the 1 June 2014 FIBA 3x3 National Federation Rankings.

Girls' Tournament
Roster
 Amphawa Thumon
 Konrawee Phongkwan
 Rujiwan Bunsinprom
 Varitta Srijunvong

Group Stage

Round of 16

Knockout Stage

Girls' Shoot-Out Contest
Skills Competition

Beach Volleyball

Thailand qualified a boys' and girls' team by their performance at the AVC Qualification Tournament.

Golf

Thailand qualified one team of two athletes based on the 8 June 2014 IGF Combined World Amateur Golf Rankings.

Individual

Team

Gymnastics

Artistic Gymnastics

Thailand qualified one athlete based on its performance at the 2014 Asian Artistic Gymnastics Championships.

Boys

Sailing

Thailand qualified four boats based on its performance at the Byte CII Asian Continental Qualifiers and Techno 293 Asian Continental Qualifiers.

Shooting

Thailand qualified one shooter based on its performance at the 2014 Asian Shooting Championships.

Individual

Team

Swimming

Thailand qualified four swimmers.

Boys

Girls

Mixed

Table Tennis

Thailand qualified two athletes, Tamolwan Khetkhuan qualified by the ITTF Under-18 World Rankings and Padasak Tanviriyavechakul qualified as the winner of a Road to Nanjing tournament.

Singles

Team

Qualification Legend: Q=Main Bracket (medal); qB=Consolation Bracket (non-medal)

Taekwondo

Thailand qualified two athletes based on its performance at the Taekwondo Qualification Tournament.

Boys

Girls

Tennis

Thailand qualified one athlete based on the 9 June 2014 ITF World Junior Rankings.

Singles

Doubles

Weightlifting

Thailand qualified 1 quota in the boys' events and 2 quotas in the girls' events based on the team ranking after the 2013 Weightlifting Youth World Championships.

Boys

Girls

References

2014 in Thai sport
Nations at the 2014 Summer Youth Olympics
Thailand at the Youth Olympics